Red Wing pottery refers to American stoneware, pottery, or dinnerware items made by a company initially set up in Red Wing, Minnesota, in 1861 by German immigrant John Paul, which changed its names several times until finally settling on Red Wing Potteries, Inc. in 1936.  The pottery factory that started in 1861 continues to the present day under the names of Red Wing Pottery and Red Wing Stoneware. There was a respite in production when Red Wing Pottery Sales, Inc. had a strike in 1967 causing them to temporarily cease trading. The company still makes both zinc/Bristol glazed products as well as salt-glazed, hand-thrown, kiln fired items.

Previous Pottery names used in Red Wing 
Pottery was and is produced in Red Wing, MN by under various names from 1861 to the present.

Many different ink stamped, impressed, and hand painted marks were used.

Initial start
Pottery produced by John Paul, a German immigrant potter, in a farm near Red Bull, over the years 1861 through to 1863, using the techniques he had previously learned.

Red Wing Terra Cotta Works 
The pottery production was continued by William M. Philleo under the name of Red Wing Terra Cotta Works, altering John Paul recipe by adding silica to the natural red clay.

Minnesota Stoneware Company

An offshoot of Red Wing Terra Cotta Works, the Minnesota Stoneware Company was in production from 1880 to 1906, making a salt-glazed version of the pottery.  It is one of the companies that merged to form Red Wing Union Stoneware Company.

North Star Stoneware

North Star Stoneware was in production from 1892 to 1896.

Red Wing Stoneware Company

Red Wing Stoneware Company was in operation from 1877 to 1906.  It is one of the companies that merged to form Red Wing Union Stoneware Company. In 1984 John Falconer bought the rights to the name and started manufacturing stoneware again in Red Wing. In 2013 B. and I. Johnson purchased the company.

Union Stoneware Company

Union Stoneware Company was in production from 1894 to 1906. It is one of the companies that merged to form Red Wing Union Stoneware Company.

Red Wing Union Stoneware Company

Red Wing Union Stoneware Company incorporated all the offshoot companies under the operating name of Red Wing Union Stoneware Company, and operated from 1906 to 1936.

Red Wing Union Stoneware Co. Art Pottery

In 1926 Red Wing began producing Art Pottery.  The first production was of "Brushed Ware". 
For the first time each shape was marked with an ink stamped number.

Red Wing Potteries, Inc.

Red Wing Potteries, Inc. is the same company as Red Wing Union Stoneware Company.  The name changed in 1936 and was retained until the pottery closed in 1967.

RumRill Art pottery by Red Wing
RumRill Art pottery, founded by George Rumrill, was made by Red Wing from 1933 to 1937. George Rumrill was an art pottery designer & salesman who contracted with Red Wing to make his art pottery. RumRill shapes were numbered from 50 to 677.)

From 1938 to 1941 RumRill pottery was made in Ohio and possibly by Shawnee Pottery, Gondor Pottery and Florence Pottery in Mount Gilead, OH

Art pottery by Red Wing
In 1938 Red Wing began producing art Pottery under its own name.  For several years they remarked existing RumRill shapes

Red Wing Dinnerware
Dinnerware was made by Red Wing from 1935 to 1967. More than 100 hand decorated patterns were produced. View pictures of all the dinnerware patterns at Golden State Red Wing's Learning page For detailed Red Wing dinnerware information see

Red Wing Pottery was formed in 1967, when R.A. Gillmer (the last President of Red Wing Potteries) purchased the company from the other shareholders during liquidation.  The company operated primarily as a retail business until 1996 when the third generation of the Gillmer family began production again with a smaller output than its early boom years. In 2013 Bruce and Irene Johnson purchased the company to be run as a family business and kept in Red Wing.

Samples of wares

See also
Red Wing Collectors Society
Fiesta (dinnerware)

References

Companies based in Minnesota
Red Wing, Minnesota
Ceramics manufacturers of the United States